A shark tunnel (or aquarium tunnel, acrylic tunnel and exhibit tunnel) is an underwater tunnel that passes through an aquarium, typically with sharks and related aquatic life.
They are usually made of thick acrylic glass.

Most aquarium tunnels are cylindrical in shape, though tunnels can be made elliptical (to make them wider and still keep the top of the tunnel closer to the visitors), or even square.

List of aquariums with shark tunnels
This list is sorted alphabetically by aquarium name.

See also

 Ithaa, an underwater restaurant in the Maldives.
 List of Aquaria

Notes

Aquariums